In Dub is a psychedelic dub album released in October 2002. It is a collection of Hallucinogen tracks remixed by the record producer Ott.

Track listing
"Mi-Loony-Um ('A Floating Butterfly Stings Like a Bee' Mix)"
"Solstice ('Warwick Bassmonkey' Mix)"
"Gamma Goblins ('It's Turtles All the Way Down' Mix)"
"Spiritual Antiseptic ('Minty Fresh Confidence' Mix)"
"L.S.D. ('World Sheet of Closed String' Mix)"
"Angelic Particles ('Buckminster Fullerine' Mix)"

References

Hallucinogen (musician) albums
2002 remix albums